Lancer is a special service area in the Canadian province of Saskatchewan within the Rural Municipality of Miry Creek No. 229 and Census Division No. 8. It held village status between 1913 and 2022.

History 
Lancer incorporated as a village on September 11, 1913. It restructured on August 1, 2022, relinquishing its village status in favour of becoming a special service area under the jurisdiction of the Rural Municipality of Miry Creek No. 229.

Demographics 

See also 
 List of communities in Saskatchewan

References 

Special service areas in Saskatchewan
Miry Creek No. 229, Saskatchewan
Division No. 8, Saskatchewan